The 2010 CERH Women's European League was the 4th season of Europe's premier female club roller hockey competition organized by CERH.

Gijón defended its title and achieved its third crown.

Results
The Final Four was played in Gijón, Spain

References

External links
 

CERH
Rink Hockey European Female League